Jinggangshan or Jinggang Shan() may refer to:

 Jinggangshan Mountains 
 Jinggangshan City, named after the mountains
 Jinggang Shan (999), a Chinese military Type 071 amphibious transport dock
 BAW Jinggangshan, a car model produced by BAW